The calendar of saints of the Episcopal Anglican Church of Brazil (Igreja Episcopal Anglicana do Brasil, IEAB) follows the tradition of The Episcopal Church (TEC), of which it was a missionary district until 1965.

History 

The most recent edition of the calendar, elaborated by IEAB's Liturgical Commission for the liturgical year which has started on Advent Sunday (30 November 2014), tried to balance the number of male and female figures.

Characteristics 
There is no single, unified calendar for the various provinces of the Anglican Communion; each makes its own calendar suitable for its local situation. As a result, the IEAB calendar contains some important figures in the history of Brazil, such as Black warrior Zumbi dos Palmares, Native warrior Sepé Tiaraju, and environmentalist Chico Mendes. At the same time, there are figures from other provinces as well as post-Reformation Catholics, such as nun Dulce Pontes.

The holy days are divided in principal feasts, festivals and lesser festivals. To settle any doubts regarding the sanctity of post-Reformed, uncanonized figures, all of them are commemorated in lesser Festivals, whose celebration is optional.

References

External links 

 "Normas para o Ano Cristão". Episcopal Anglican Church of Brazil. 27 November 2014. Available for download at:  . Accessed July 26, 2015.

Brazil
Anglican Episcopal Church of Brazil